Design leadership is a concept complementary to design management. In practice, design managers within companies often operate in the field of design leadership and design leaders in the field of design management. However, the two terms are not interchangeable; they are interdependent. In essence, design leadership aims to define future strategies, and design management is responsible for implementation. Both are critically important to business, government, and society, and both are necessary in order to maximize value from design activity and investment.

Design leadership can be described as leadership that generates innovative design solutions. Turner defines design leadership by adding three additional aspects for design leadership:
the difference in leading through design,
the sustaining design leadership over time
the gaining of acknowledgment for achievements through design.

Turner separates the core responsibilities of design leadership into the following six activities:
envisioning of the future
manifesting strategic intent
directing design investment
managing corporate reputation
creating and nurturing an environment of innovation
training for design leadership

References

Further reading
Turner, R.: Design Leadership: Securing the Strategic Value of Design. (Routledge) 2013. 
Goleman, D.: What makes a leader? Harvard Business Review 1998, Vol.76, No.9
McBride, M.: Design Management: Future Forward. Design Management Review, Summer 2007
Mullins, L.J.: Management and organisational behavior. (Pitman Publishing) 2004. 
Turner, R., Topalian, A.: Core responsibilities of design leaders in commercially demanding environments. 2002, Inaugural presentation at the Design Leadership Forum.
Zaleznik, A.: Managers and Leaders: Are They Different?. Harvard Business Review 2000, Vol. 82, No.1

See also
Corporate Identity
Design management
Design
Leadership
Reputation management

Management theory
Design